Christian Jürgensen (born 6 April 1985) is a German former footballer who played as a centre-back.

References

External links
 
 

1985 births
Living people
People from Flensburg
Footballers from Schleswig-Holstein
German footballers
Association football defenders
3. Liga players
Regionalliga players
Holstein Kiel players
Holstein Kiel II players
SC Weiche Flensburg 08 players
21st-century German people